100% Mexicano is a studio album by Mexican-American performer Pepe Aguilar. It was released on September 18, 2007, by Equinoccio Records and distributed by EMI Televisa Music. Aguilar was awarded the Best Mexican/Mexican-American Album at the 50th Grammy Awards and received a nomination for Best Ranchero Album at the Latin Grammy Awards of 2008.

Track listing

Chart performance

Sales and certifications

References

2007 albums
Pepe Aguilar albums
Spanish-language albums
EMI Televisa Music albums